Margarites avachensis is a species of sea snail, a marine gastropod mollusk in the family Margaritidae.

Description
The shell attains a height of 15 mm.

Distribution
This marine species occurs in the Northern Pacific.

References

 Gulbin V.V. & Chaban E.M. (2012) Annotated list of shell-bearing gastropods of Commander Islands. Part I. The Bulletin of the Russian Far East Malacological Society 15-16: 5–30.

External links
 To Encyclopedia of Life
 To USNM Invertebrate Zoology Mollusca Collection
 To World Register of Marine Species

avachensis
Gastropods described in 1955